Amdy Gueye (born 22 August 1980 in Dakar) is a Senegalese football defender who notably played in the Corgoň liga for Spartak Trnava.

References

External links
at spartak.sk
at eurofotbal.cz

1980 births
Living people
Senegalese footballers
Association football defenders
FC Spartak Trnava players
Slovak Super Liga players
Senegalese expatriate sportspeople in Slovakia
Expatriate footballers in Slovakia
Footballers from Dakar